The Communist Party of Nepal (United Marxist) was a political party in Nepal existing from 2005 until 2013.

History 
The party was formed on 15 September 2005 through the merger of Communist Party of Nepal (United) and Communist Party of Nepal (Marxist). The party was a member of the United Left Front during the 2006 Nepalese revolution.

Bishnu Bahadur Manandhar, general secretary of CPN (United), was the general secretary of the party but later stepped down, and Prabhu Narayan Chaudhari, president of the CPN (Marxist), was the president of the party. The founding unification conference also elected a 34-member Central Committee and an 82-member National Council. The trade union wing of CPN (UM) was Nepal Progressive Trade Union Federation (NPTUF) and the students wing of the party was the Nepal Progressive Student Federation (NPSF).

In mid-October 2006, the party went through an internal crisis. Prabhu Narayan Chaudhuri received harsh criticism from party members over his actions as Minister of Land Reforms. On 14 October, he was gheraoed in his office by party cadres. Ten politburo members, including both Manandhar and Chaudhuri, resigned. Chandra Deo Joshi was appointed acting chairman whereas Lok Narayan Subedi became the new general secretary of the party. In 2007, Ganesh Shah and Chandra Deo Joshi broke away from the party and refounded CPN (United). 

The party contested the 2008 Constituent Assembly election but failed to get a seat. In April 2013, the party merged with five other parties and formed the Communist Party of Nepal which received its registration for contesting the 2013 Constituent Assembly election.

Electoral performance

See also 
 List of communist parties in Nepal

References

External links 
 NCP (United-Marxist) demands republic, peace

Defunct communist parties in Nepal
Political parties established in 2005
2005 establishments in Nepal
Political parties disestablished in 2013
2013 disestablishments in Nepal